Tammy MacIntosh (born 16 February 1970) is an Australian actress known for portraying Dr. Charlotte Beaumont in the medical drama All Saints and Jool in the TV series Farscape. She is also known for her roles on television series The Flying Doctors, Police Rescue, Sea Patrol, the television film McLeod's Daughters which led to the acclaimed drama series of the same title, and played the role of Kaz Proctor in the prison drama series Wentworth, until her departure in June 2019.

Early and personal life
MacIntosh was born on 16 February 1970 in Perth, where she attended Morley Senior High School, Girrawheen Senior High School and Mount Lawley Senior High School. MacIntosh graduated from the Western Australian Academy of Performing Arts, a division of Edith Cowan University.

MacIntosh is married to Mark Yeats and they have a son.

Career
MacIntosh started out as a reporter for a children's show C'mon Kids in South Australia in the late eighties.

MacIntosh has an extensive list of TV credits including The Flying Doctors, Something in the Air, Grass Roots, Stingers, State Coroner, Wildside, McLeod's Daughters, G.P., The Feds III and Chances. She was also a well-known face in her regular role of Kathy in Police Rescue. MacIntosh played a main character in the first season of the BAFTA Award-winning BBC show, Jeopardy.

In 1998, MacIntosh appeared in the detective series Good Guys, Bad Guys.

MacIntosh joined the science fiction television series Farscape in late 2000. She was cast as Jool, a young Interion woman. She made her first appearance in the third-season episode "Self-Inflicted Wounds Part I: Could'a, Would'a, Should'a". In 2002, MacIntosh was cast as Dr Charlotte Beaumont in the medical drama All Saints. MacIntosh took the role of Charlotte as she saw the character as a new challenge. She was initially contracted for six weeks. Of Charlotte, MacIntosh commented "she's been empowering to play. I felt much stronger and more confident in who I was than I had in a long time." MacIntosh became one of the show's longest serving cast members joining in series 5 and staying until its final season went to air.
 
Macintosh's film and theatre credits include Police Rescue: The Movie, the Melbourne Theatre Company's Shark Fin Soup, the Sydney Theatre Company's Private Lives, the Ensemble Theatre's Blinded by the Sun and Sleeping Beauty.

She had a recurring role on Sea Patrol portraying Commander Maxine "Knocker" White. She also played Doctor Elizabeth "Mac" Macmillan in ABC's crime drama Miss Fisher's Murder Mysteries, and Doctor Amelia Ward in "Episode 9" of Crownies.

MacIntosh was considered for the role of Bea Smith in prison drama Wentworth. She later joined the cast in the third season as vigilante Kaz Proctor, alongside actresses Pia Miranda and Libby Tanner.

Tammy would exit Wentworth in series 7 as the show begun to take a toll on her. Macintosh revealed the extent of filming would leave her 'crying while going on walks' and she would facetime her son every night during production. Tammy spoke with the production team at the end of series six to inform them that the upcoming seventh season would be her last as Kaz. During series seven Kaz dies in the fourth episode of season 7 in a horrific killing.

Macintosh would join several of her co-stars from Wentworth during 2022 and appeared at both a Screen Star Event in London and Birmingham and would also appear at the Wentworth Con fan convention in Melbourne.

Filmography

Film

Television

Theatre

References

External links

Tammy Macintosh on Instagram

1970 births
Australian film actresses
Australian stage actresses
Australian television actresses
Actresses from Perth, Western Australia
Living people
People educated at Mount Lawley Senior High School
20th-century Australian actresses
21st-century Australian actresses
Western Australian Academy of Performing Arts alumni